Tuykovo is a rural locality (a village) in Pekshinskoye Rural Settlement, Petushinsky District, Vladimir Oblast, Russia. The population was 7 as of 2010.

Geography 
Tuykovo is located on the Peksha River, 30 km northeast of Petushki (the district's administrative centre) by road. Vypolzovo is the nearest rural locality.

References 

Rural localities in Petushinsky District